The 1998 Football Association Charity Shield (also known as The AXA FA Charity Shield for sponsorship reasons) was the 76th FA Charity Shield, an annual English football match organised by The Football Association and played between the winners of the previous season's Premier League and FA Cup competitions. It was contested on 9 August 1998 by Arsenal – who won a league and FA Cup double the previous season – and Manchester United – who finished as runners-up in the league. Watched by a crowd of 67,342 at Wembley Stadium in London, Arsenal won the match 3–0.

This was Manchester United's 18th Charity Shield appearance to Arsenal's 14th. Manchester United began the game more strongly, but Arsenal took the lead when Marc Overmars scored 11 minutes before half-time. They extended their lead in the second half, as Overmars and Nicolas Anelka found Christopher Wreh, who put the ball into an empty net at the second attempt. In the 72nd minute, Arsenal scored a third goal, when Anelka got around Jaap Stam in the penalty box and shot the ball past goalkeeper Peter Schmeichel.

Arsenal's victory marked Manchester United's first Shield defeat in 13 years. The teams later faced each other in the FA Cup semi-final, which was won by Manchester United in a replay. Manchester United finished the league season one point ahead of Arsenal and went on to win the FA Cup and UEFA Champions League, thereby completing a treble of trophies in the 1998–99 season.

Background

Founded in 1908 as a successor to the Sheriff of London Charity Shield, the FA Charity Shield began as a contest between the respective champions of The Football League and the Southern League, although in 1913, it was played between an Amateurs XI and a Professionals XI. In 1921, it was contested by the league champions of the top division and FA Cup winners for the first time.

Arsenal qualified for the 1998 FA Charity Shield as winners of both the 1997–98 FA Premier League and the 1997–98 FA Cup. Although they were 12 points behind league leaders Manchester United by the end of February 1998, a nine-match winning streak, culminating in a 4–0 win over Everton on 3 May 1998, ensured Arsenal won the title. Arsenal then beat Newcastle United 2–0 in the 1998 FA Cup Final to complete the domestic double. Given they won both honours, the other Charity Shield place went to league runners-up Manchester United.

The most recent meeting between the two teams was in the Premier League on 14 March 1998, when a second-half goal by Marc Overmars gave Arsenal a 1–0 win at Old Trafford, the second of Arsenal's nine wins in a row. Arsenal were the only team in the 1997–98 league to beat United home and away; the corresponding home fixture on 9 November 1997 ended 3–2. Arsenal manager Arsène Wenger acknowledged the Shield game was the "only opportunity to play our first-team men together against top-class opposition" before their league campaign commenced the following week. Manchester United manager Alex Ferguson was preoccupied with the team's match against ŁKS Łódź in the second qualifying round of the UEFA Champions League three days later.

The match was officially referred to as "The AXA FA Charity Shield" as part of a sponsorship deal between The Football Association and French insurance group AXA, agreed in July 1998. The deal also saw the FA Cup referred to as "The AXA Sponsored FA Cup" for its four-year duration.

Venue
The match was played at Wembley Stadium, which first hosted the Shield in 1974.

Match

Team selection
Manchester United winger Jesper Blomqvist, who had signed from Parma just under three weeks earlier, was ruled out with an ankle injury, but Roy Keane was fit enough to start his first competitive match since rupturing his cruciate ligaments 11 months previously. Defender Jaap Stam, who signed for United in July 1998, made his competitive debut for the club, partnering centre-back Ronny Johnsen. For Arsenal, new signing Nelson Vivas began the match on the substitutes' bench, in spite of being expected to make his full debut, while Dennis Bergkamp started alongside Nicolas Anelka up front.

Arsenal employed a traditional 4–4–2 formation: a four-man defence (comprising two centre-backs and left and right full-backs), four midfielders (two in the centre, and one on each wing) and two centre-forwards. Manchester United organised themselves slightly differently, and lined up in a 4–4–1–1 formation with Paul Scholes playing ahead of the midfield in a supporting role behind the main striker, Andy Cole.

Summary
United fashioned their first chance through David Beckham, who was booed throughout the match on account of many fans blaming him for England's elimination from the 1998 FIFA World Cup. His pass eventually met Scholes, whose attempt forced Arsenal goalkeeper David Seaman to clear. In spite of United's promising start, it was Arsenal who scored the opening goal. Vieira played the ball down the right side of the penalty area in the direction of Bergkamp and Anelka. Bergkamp got there first and back-heeled the ball to Anelka, but the Frenchman was unable to take control; however, he was able to put pressure on Johnsen in the Manchester United defence and blocked the Norwegian's attempted clearance. The ball ran across the edge of the penalty area to Overmars, who lashed it right-footed past Manchester United goalkeeper Peter Schmeichel into the net. A shot by Keane from  prompted a save from Seaman in the 42nd minute.

Arsenal began dominating in the second half, and increased their lead after 57 minutes. From the left wing, Overmars used his pace to get the better of Gary Neville and passed the ball to Anelka, who turned and passed to an unmarked Christopher Wreh. Schmeichel blocked the Liberian's initial shot with his feet, but he was unable to stop the second attempt, which Wreh celebrated acrobatically. Despite the setback, United continued to press Arsenal; defender Martin Keown almost put the ball into his own goal from Ryan Giggs's corner. Both teams made mass substitutions in the final third of the game, notably Teddy Sheringham and Luís Boa Morte coming on for Cole – who rarely threatened – and Petit, respectively. Arsenal scored their third in the 72nd minute – Parlour's pass found Anelka, who got around Stam and shot the ball past Schmeichel from a narrow angle, inside the goalkeeper's near post. Near the end, Sheringham wasted a goal-scoring opportunity, shooting wide.

Details

Source:

Statistics

Post-match

The result marked Manchester United's first defeat in the Charity Shield since 1985, during which time they had appeared in the competition five times, and the ninth time Arsenal had won it. Arsenal became the first southern club to win the Shield outright since Tottenham Hotspur in 1962. Wenger described the scoreline as "unexpected" and cited the first goal as crucial in the match, given the weather conditions. He was content with how his international players, who had been at the World Cup, coped with the game's physicality.

Ferguson admitted his team had been beaten by the better side and agreed with Wenger that the first goal was important. He was pleased that Keane got through the match after 11 months out of action and was confident his team would fare better against ŁKS Łódź, the following Wednesday. Schmeichel felt the upcoming Champions League qualifier was more important than the Charity Shield game, which he considered as a pre-season match. Ferguson anticipated another challenge from Arsenal in the league: "I think you could make a strong case for four teams to challenge for the Premiership but I think Arsenal pose the biggest threat."

Three days after the Charity Shield match, United beat ŁKS Łódź 2–0 and qualified for the Champions League group stage following a goalless match a fortnight later. Arsenal had the upper hand in their two league meetings with United during the season, winning 3–0 at Highbury in September 1998, before a 1–1 draw at Old Trafford in February 1999. The two teams went into the final day of the 1998–99 FA Premier League vying for the title, but United's 2–1 win against Tottenham meant they finished one point above Arsenal. The two sides met twice more that season in the FA Cup semi-final, which was settled in a replay after the original match finished goalless. Manchester United won in extra time – the winning goal scored by Giggs. United then went on to defeat Newcastle United 2–0 in the 1999 FA Cup Final. Whereas Arsenal failed to progress past the group stage of the Champions League, Manchester United went on to reach the final, where they beat Bayern Munich to win the competition for the second time. Ferguson's team therefore completed a treble of trophies in one season.

See also
1998–99 Arsenal F.C. season
1998–99 Manchester United F.C. season
Arsenal F.C.–Manchester United F.C. rivalry

Notes

References

FA Community Shield
Charity Shield 1998
Charity Shield 1998
Comm
FA Charity Shield